Janco Venter (born 19 September 1994) is a Namibian rugby union player. He plays at lock or flanker for Saracens and has represented Namibia at International level. He was named in Namibia's squad for the 2015 Rugby World Cup.

On 19 March 2018, it was announced Venter had signed for Jersey Reds, in the RFU Championship. He left Jersey in July 2020 to join Saracens from the 2020-21 season.

References

External links
 

1994 births
Living people
Namibian rugby union players
Namibia international rugby union players
White Namibian people
Place of birth missing (living people)
Rugby union flankers
Rugby union locks
Rugby union number eights
Rugby union players from Windhoek
Welwitschias players
Western Province (rugby union) players
Jersey Reds players
Saracens F.C. players
Griquas (rugby union) players